Faradje Airport  is an airport serving the town of Faradje, Haut-Uélé Province, Democratic Republic of the Congo.

See also

 Transport in the Democratic Republic of the Congo
 List of airports in the Democratic Republic of the Congo

References

External links
 OpenStreetMap - Faradje Airport
 OurAirports - Faradje Airport
 FallingRain - Faradje Airport
 

Airports in Haut-Uélé